Tom Dernies (born 22 November 1990 in Soignies) is a Belgian cyclist, who currently rides for French amateur team Dunkerque Grand Littoral–Cofidis. His father Michel Dernies also competed professionally as a cyclist.

Major results

2012
 4th Omloop Het Nieuwsblad Beloften
 7th Ronde Pévéloise
2013
 2nd Flèche Ardennaise
 3rd Kattekoers
 4th Beverbeek Classic
 6th Grand Prix de la ville de Nogent-sur-Oise
 6th Memorial Van Coningsloo
2014
 1st  Mountains classification Tour de Luxembourg
 1st  Mountains classification Tour de l'Eurométropole
 6th Kattekoers
 7th Overall Circuit des Ardennes
 10th Classic Loire Atlantique
 10th Le Samyn
2015
 7th Tour du Doubs
2019
 8th Grand Prix de la ville de Nogent-sur-Oise

References

External links

1990 births
Living people
Belgian male cyclists
People from Soignies
Cyclists from Hainaut (province)
21st-century Belgian people